Eodorcadion virgatum is a species of beetle in the family Cerambycidae. It was described by Victor Motschulsky in 1854. It is known from Mongolia.

Subspecies
 Eodorcadion virgatum subvirgatum (Pic, 1914)
 Eodorcadion virgatum virgatum (Motschulsky, 1854)

References

Dorcadiini
Beetles described in 1854